The 2014–15 season was Raith Rovers' sixth consecutive season in the second tier of Scottish football having been promoted from the Scottish Second Division at the end of the 2008–09 season. Raith Rovers also competed in the Challenge Cup, League Cup and the Scottish Cup.

Summary

Management
Raith were led by player-manager Grant Murray for the 2014–15 season as with the previous season, having extended his contract in December 2013, until 2016.

Results & fixtures

Pre season

Scottish Championship

Scottish Challenge Cup

Scottish League Cup

Scottish Cup

Fife Cup

Player statistics

Captain

Squad 
Last updated 2 May 2015

|}

Disciplinary record
Includes all competitive matches.

Last updated May 2015

Team statistics

League table

Division summary

Management statistics
Last updated on 2 May 2015

Notes

References

Raith Rovers F.C. seasons
Raith Rovers